Elegie, Op.36 is a 1922 song cycle for baritone and chamber orchestra by Othmar Schoeck. The cycle consists of 24 German-language settings of Nikolaus Lenau and Joseph Freiherr von Eichendorff. The Elegie is the earliest of Schoeck's song-cycles, coming after his opera Venus (1919–21).

Recordings
Peter Lagger, Camerata Zürich, cond. Räto Tschupp, 1975 
Arthur Loosli,  Berner Kammerensemble, cond. Theo Hug, Jecklin
Klaus Mertens, Mutare Ensemble, Gerhard Müller-Hornbach, NCA 2003 
Andreas Schmidt, Musikkollegium Winterthur, cond. Werner Andreas Albert, CPO
Christian Gerhaher, Kammerorchester Basel, cond. Heinz Holliger, Sony, 2022.

References

Classical song cycles
Compositions by Othmar Schoeck
Adaptations of works by Joseph von Eichendorff
1922 compositions